Michael Haydn's Symphony No. 38 in F major, Perger 30, Sherman 38, MH 477, written in Salzburg in 1788, is the next to last F major symphony he wrote, the fifth of his final set of six symphonies.

The symphony is scored for 2 oboes, 2 bassoons, 2 horns and strings. Sherman's edition of the score has "Cembalo" written in square brackets, suggesting continuo is optional in this work, despite his often-repeated statement that Haydn considered continuo essential even in the most fully instrumented works. This work is in three movements:

Allegro molto
Andantino, in C major
Scherzando

Unlike the other symphonies in the final set of six, this one starts out piano and then states its theme forte, whereas the others first state it forte and then piano (though this is not unique among Haydn's symphonies). Despite its using horns in F, which became standard, the parts are still fairly limited to few notes in addition to F and C. However, in the recapitulation of the first movement, the first horn doubles the first violins an octave lower on the first theme. In the slow movement, the celli, instead of doubling the bassoons and basses on the bass line, double the first violins an octave lower and are written in tenor clef (changing to bass clef for a few measures in which they rejoin the bass complex).

Completed on February 10, the autograph score was bequeathed by Prince Esterházy to Hungary's national library in Budapest. Charles Sherman based his edition for Ludwig Doblinger "on a set of performance parts, bearing corrections in the composer's hand," from "the music collection of the Benedictine Archabbey of St. Peter in Salzburg."

Discography

Like the other symphonies of the 1788 set of six, this one is in the CPO disc with Johannes Goritzki conducting the New German Chamber Academy.

References

 A. Delarte, "A Quick Overview Of The Instrumental Music Of Michael Haydn" Bob's Poetry Magazine November 2006: 31 PDF
 Charles H. Sherman and T. Donley Thomas, Johann Michael Haydn (1737 - 1806), a chronological thematic catalogue of his works. Stuyvesant, New York: Pendragon Press (1993)
 C. Sherman, "Johann Michael Haydn" in The Symphony: Salzburg, Part 2 London: Garland Publishing (1982): lxix

Symphony 38
Compositions in F major
1788 compositions